George Alan Lachlan Wilson (28 March 1895 – 24 April 1942) was an Australian politician.

He was born at Balmain in Sydney to grazier Samuel Wilson and Mary Elizabeth, née Maclean. He was educated at Scotch College in Melbourne before returning to the family property at Lake Cowal near Forbes. He served in the Australian Imperial Force from 1916 to 1917 and lost a leg at the Battle of the Somme. From 1920 to 1930 he was a Bland Shire Councillor (president 1921–23, 1924–25). He married Freda Maud Stitt on 27 May 1926. In the 1930s he subdivided and sold his property and purchased an experimental immigration farm; politically he was a member of the Country Party and a co-founder of the Riverina Movement, advocating a new state in western New South Wales.

In 1932, Wilson was elected to the New South Wales Legislative Assembly as the member for Dubbo. He studied conditions in Europe and the Soviet Union in 1938 and was a member of the Commonwealth Liquid and Fuel Control Board from 1941 to 1942. In April 1942, still a serving MLA, he died in Sydney.

References

 

1895 births
1942 deaths
National Party of Australia members of the Parliament of New South Wales
Members of the New South Wales Legislative Assembly
Australian military personnel of World War I
People educated at Scotch College, Melbourne
New South Wales local councillors
Politicians from Sydney
20th-century Australian politicians